is a Japanese alpine skier. He competed in two events at the 1968 Winter Olympics.

References

1945 births
Living people
Japanese male alpine skiers
Olympic alpine skiers of Japan
Alpine skiers at the 1968 Winter Olympics
Sportspeople from Hokkaido
20th-century Japanese people